Diaphus schmidti,  is a species of lanternfish found in the Widespread areas of the tropical and the subtropical Pacific Ocean.

Size

Etymology
The fish is named in honor of Danish biologist Johannes Schmidt (1877–1933), who led the Dana expedition that collected the type specimen.

References

Myctophidae
Taxa named by Åge Vedel Tåning
Fish described in 1932
Fish of the Pacific Ocean